KOMI-CD, virtual channel 24 (UHF digital channel 34), is a low-powered, Class A YouToo America-affiliated television station licensed to Woodward, Oklahoma, United States. The station is owned by the Omni Broadcasting Company.

It operates under common ownership with KWOX ("K101", country) and KMZE ("Z92 Power Hits").

References

External links

Low-power television stations in the United States
OMI-CD
Television channels and stations established in 1995
YTA TV affiliates